Thana means "police station" in South Asian countries, and can also mean the district controlled by a police station.

 Thanas of Bangladesh, former subdistricts in the administrative geography of Bangladesh; later renamed upazila
 in (British) Indian history, a thana was a group of princely states deemed too small to perform all functions separately
Thane is a city named after the word thana (police station) because it was important for its barracks back in colonial era, it is located in Konkan division, a province of India
Thana Bhawan, also known simply as Thana, is a town in Uttar Pradesh, India

See also 
 
 
 Tana (disambiguation)
 Thaana, also known as Tāna, the modern writing system of the Divehi language

Types of administrative division